Dacunju is a genus of moths in the family Saturniidae first described by Travassos and Noronha in 1965.

Species
Dacunju jucunda (Walker, 1855)

References

Ceratocampinae